Incidentals is an album by American composer and saxophonist Tim Berne's band Snakeoil which was released on the ECM label in 2017.

Reception

The Allmusic review by Thom Jurek awarded the album 4 stars and stated "this five-track set offers what is by now an unmistakable sound, with Berne's constantly interweaving scripted melodies, modes, and dialogues seamlessly wedded to group improvisation. When combined, they create not only a musical signature, but a shared language".

Writing in The Guardian, John Fordham commented "This fourth Snakeoil album for ECM is one of the most viscerally direct and exciting chapters in a consistently creative story".

The All About Jazz review by Karl Ackermann said that "Long ago surpassing his mentor Julius Hemphill, Berne has been furthering the late saxophonist's technique and taking his own compositional skills to progressively higher levels. In Snakeoil he has found a perfect formation, where traditional solos are minimized and group dynamics dictate the sound. Just as could be said with each preceding Snakeoil release, Incidentals is the group's best release to date" while Mark Sullivan stated "The integration of composition and improvisation typical of Berne's work is especially pronounced in this program".

The JazzTimes review by Lloyd Sachs observed "Among its many rewards, Incidentals documents the growth of the exciting partnership between Berne and Mitchell. ... he relates to the leader through the heady way he embroiders open spaces, enhances the album’s pervasive classical imprint, intensifies the architecture of certain tunes and subtly colors the aural landscape with electronic touches".

Track listing
All compositions by Tim Berne except as indicated
 "Hora Feliz" – 10:26
 "Stingray Shuffle" – 7:36
 "Sideshow" – 26:01
 "Incidentals Contact" – 10:47
 "Prelude One / Sequel Too" (Matt Mitchell, Berne / Berne) – 9:17

Personnel
Tim Berne – alto saxophone
Ryan Ferreira – electric guitar
Oscar Noriega – clarinet, bass clarinet
Matt Mitchell – piano, electronics
Ches Smith – drums, vibraphone, percussion, timpani
David Torn – guitar (tracks 1 [Intro] and 3 [Outro])

References

ECM Records albums
Tim Berne albums
2017 albums
Albums produced by David Torn